The first volume of Telstar Records' Deep Heat compilation series was released 4 March 1989 and contained 26 tracks. It was hugely successful and reached No. 1 on the Compilations Chart. It achieved a UK gold disc for album sales in excess of 100,000 copies.

Track listing
NB: Disc/cassette 1 (CD1 or Sides One and Two) features all 7" mixes while disc/cassette 2 (CD2/sides three and four) features all 12" mixes.

Side One
Adeva - "Respect"
Fast Eddie - "I Can Dance"
Richie Rich - "My D.J. (Pump It Up Some)"
Hard House - "Check This Out"
Hithouse - "Jack to the Sound of the Underground"
Sugar Bear - "Don't Scandalize Mine" (Vocal Mix)
Black Riot - "A Day in the Life"

Side Two
Royal House - "Yeah Buddy"
The Todd Terry Project - "Bango (To the Batmobile)"
Swan Lake - "In the Name of Love" (Club Mix)
Mr. Lee - "Rock This Place" (UK Club Mix)
Wee Papa Girl Rappers - "Soulmate"
Joe Smooth - "Promised Land"
Petula Clark - "Downtown '88"

Side Three
Fast Eddie - "Hip House" (Deep Mix)
Milli Vanilli - "Girl You Know It's True"
Kevin Saunderson - "Bounce Your Body to the Box" (Exclusive Mike "Hitman" Wilson Remix)
John Paul Barrett - "Should've Known Better" (Club Mix)
Smith & Mighty - "Walk On ..."
Raze - "Break 4 Love" (English 12" Mix)

Side Four
Royal House - "Can You Party" (Club Mix)
Hithouse - "Jack to the Sound of the Underground" (Acid Mix)
Humanoid - "Stakker Humanoid" (Snowman Mix)
Baby Ford - "Chikki Chikki Ahh Ahh"
Donnell Rush - "Knockin' at My Door" (Club Mix)
Bootleggers - "Hot Mix 3" (X-Plicit Mix)

This was the first of eleven volumes released between 1989 and 1991.

References
Deep Heat listing at Discogs

1989 compilation albums
1989 remix albums
Telstar Records compilation albums
Telstar Records remix albums